There have been many Falkner Island Light keepers throughout the history of the lighthouse. The Falkner Island Lighthouse is a lighthouse in Connecticut, United States, off Guilford Harbor on Long Island Sound. The lighthouse was constructed in 1802 and commissioned by President Thomas Jefferson, warning of dangerous shoals and shallows in the area. Falkner Island Light is the second oldest extant lighthouse in Connecticut and is listed on the National Register of Historic Places.

List of keepers

References 

Falkner Island Light keepers